Athrips aquila is a moth of the family Gelechiidae. It is found in Russia (the southern Ural) and south-eastern Kazakhstan. The habitat consists of steppes with dominant shrubs such as Spiraea crenata, Spiraea hypericifolia, Caragana frutex and Cotoneaster melanocarpus.

The wingspan is 15–17 mm for males and 13.5 mm for females. The forewings are dark brown, overlaid with dark brown and white-tipped scales. The hindwings are fuscous. Adults are on wing from mid-June to late August.

Etymology
The species name is derived from Latin aquilus (meaning dark color) and refers to the dark colour of the forewings.

References

Moths described in 2010
Athrips
Moths of Asia
Moths of Europe